Gaurav Khanna is an Indian television actor and model.

Gaurav Khanna may also refer to:

 Gaurav Khanna (badminton), Indian badminton coach
 Gaurav Khanna (physicist), Indian-American physicist